ʻIzz ad-Dīn Yaḥyā (died 1338) was the Governor of the provincial Satgaon who reigned from 1328 to 1338.

History
Izzuddin was appointed the governor under the Tughlaq Delhi Sultanate. Shamsuddin Ilyas Shah took service under Izzuddin. Izzuddin further encouraged the spread of Islam among the Hindus and Buddhists of Bengal. After his death in 1338, Ilyas Shah took control of Satgaon and declared independence from Delhi.

See also
 List of rulers of Bengal
 History of Bengal
 History of India

References

Governors of Bengal
Year of birth missing
1338 deaths